Kadhal Seiya Virumbu is a 2005 Indian Tamil language romantic drama film directed by Ravi Bhargavan. The film stars Santhosh, Srisha and Ashwini, with Karunas, Vaiyapuri, Manivannan, Ravikumar, Chithra and Bharathi playing supporting roles. The film, produced by Salai Maitri, was released in May 2005. The film was dubbed in Telugu as Preminchaka.

Plot

For misinterpreting a friendly relationship with a girl to be a love affair, the college student Santhosh (Santhosh) gets a punishment from the court: to read Mahatma Gandhi's autobiography for a week in the Mother Teresa's library.
A few months later, Santhosh joins a college in Chennai. Nithika (Srisha), a studious student and a social worker, is attracted by his attitude and she falls in love with him. Santhosh likes her too but he has only one thing in mind: having sex with her. They fall in love with each other and start dating each other. One day, Santhosh tries to have sex with Nithika in his home but Nithika, who strongly believes that premarital sex is taboo, insults him and runs away.

A few months ago, Santhosh was a dedicated student in Coimbatore, he had the ambition to study aeronautics and to become a pilot. He and his collegemate Subha (Ashwini) fell in love with each other. One day, Subha wanted to have sex with him but he refused. He explained to her that love should be pure and sex should be only after the marriage. For his love, he made several sacrifices including not going to an aeronautics training. Thereafter, Subha announced to him that she will marry a wealthy NRI and explained that their love wasn't strong enough (because they didn't have sexual intercourse). He created a ruckus at the registrar's office and Subha lied by saying that they were just friends. The police then arrested Santhosh hence the punishment to read Mahatma Gandhi's autobiography.

Back to the present, Santhosh tries to reconcile with Nithika but she tells him that he is "unfit" for love. Santhosh then meets Subha, she tells him that her husband divorced her when she got breast cancer. She apologizes to him for her mistakes and she is now working in an ashram. Santhosh and Nithika finally understand their feelings, and they make up after their quarrel.

Cast

Santhosh as Santhosh 
Srisha as Nithika
Ashwini (Aswitha) as Subha
Karunas as Odibaba Ulaganathan
Vaiyapuri as Dharma
Manivannan as Nithika's father
Ravikumar as Santhosh's father
Chithra as Nithika's mother
Bharathi as Santhosh's mother
Sangeetha Balan as Flower seller
Sabitha
Sundari
Baby Shathiga as Sowmya
Balu Anand as Traffic police Palanisamy
Muthukaalai as Mechanic
Bava Lakshmanan as Pongal Perumal
Ravi Shanth as Dharman
Nakkheeran as Nakkheeran
Bayilvan Ranganathan
Omakuchi Narasimhan
Rajkrishnan
Theni Murugan
Vijay Ganesh as Tea master
Suja Varunee in a special appearance

Production
Ravi Bhargavan who made his directorial debut with Well Done (2003), returned with Kadhal Seiya Virumbu under the banner of Vision 21 Creative Team Works. Newcomer Santhosh signed to play the hero while Srisha had been signed to play the female lead. Srisha, known as Damini in Kannada cinema, made her debut as heroine in Upendra (1999). Ashwini who was credited as Aswitha in this film was selected to play the second heroine.

Soundtrack

The film score and the soundtrack were composed by G. Ram. The soundtrack features 5 tracks.

Reception
Sify described it as "a crass film which depends mainly on its heroine Srisha's anatomy and can be classified as a soft-porn movie" and concluded, "the message from the film is regressive". A reviewer wrote, "to drive home the point that premarital sex is wrong, the director bores you to tears" and added, "Music by G. Ram and cinematography by Salai Sahadevan is the only saving grace of the film". Another critic called the film "average" and praised the music.

References

2005 films
2000s Tamil-language films
2000s erotic drama films
2005 romantic drama films
Indian erotic romance films
Indian erotic drama films
Indian romantic drama films